The Episcopal Conference of Madagascar (CEM) (French: Conférence Episcopale de Madagascar) is the episcopal conference of the Catholic Church in Madagascar. Founded in 1965, it is composed of all active and retired members of the Catholic hierarchy (i.e., diocesan, coadjutor, and auxiliary bishops) in Madagascar.

The CEM is a registered corporation based in Antananarivo. The current president is the Archbishop of Toliara, Désiré Tsarahazana. The current vice president is Marie Fabien Raharilamboniaina, OCD, the Bishop of Morondava. The current secretary-general is Jean Claude Randrianarisoa, the Bishop of Miarinarivo.

History 
The Episcopal Conference of Madagascar was founded in 1965, five years after the country's independence.

In November 2016, members of the conference published a letter criticizing Madagascar's political elite and intelligentsia. The letter declared that the country "suffers from a shortage of wise men."

Presidents 
This is a list of the presidents of the Episcopal Conference of Madagascar:
 Archbishop Jérôme Rakotomalala (1965–1966)
 Archbishop Gilbert Ramanantoanina, SJ (1966–1971)
 Archbishop Albert Joseph Tsiahoana (1971–1974)
 Cardinal Victor Razafimahatratra, SJ (1974–1986)
 Archbishop Albert Joseph Tsiahoana (1986–1992)
 Bishop Jean-Guy Rakodondravahatra, MS(1992–1996)
 Cardinal Armand Razafindratandra (1996–2002)
 Archbishop Fulgence Rabeony, SJ (2002–2006)
 Archbishop Fulgence Rabemahafaly (2006 – November 2012)
 Archbishop Désiré Tsarahazana (November 2012 – )

See also 
 Catholic Church in Madagascar

References 

1966 establishments in Madagascar
Madagascar
Buildings and structures in Antananarivo
Catholic Church in Madagascar
Catholic organizations established in the 20th century
Non-profit organizations based in Africa
Christian organizations established in 1965